The cannabis industry in the U.S. state of Washington has been served by several banks and credit unions since Initiative 502 passed in 2012, legalizing production, distribution, retail sales and possession in the state.

Banks and credit unions

Three banks and Three credit unions – O Bee Credit Union in Tumwater since 2014, Numerica Credit Union in Spokane and Salal Credit Union in Seattle – handle most of the accounts. , the state took in 95% of its cannabis tax revenue through banks (vice cash) and the Washington State Department of Revenue requires electronic funds transfer for tax payment, unless the taxpayer is unable to open a bank account.

Federal regulation
Washington's governor and United States Senators have attempted to preserve U.S. Department of the Treasury FinCEN rules in place since 2014 allowing banks to do regulated transactions with the industry, despite conflicting laws on legality at the Federal level.

Alternatives to banks
Some Washington cannabis business, particularly at point of sale, is conducted in cryptocurrency. Some use Square point-of-sale system, although it has also been reported that PayPal and Square will terminate accounts from cannabis-related businesses. A cashless transaction system was created by POSaBIT and used in Washington cannabis establishments  2017. It would convert US dollars from a customer's debit card swipe to cryptocurrency for expenditures made at the retail establishment.

See also

References

Sources

Further reading

External links
Marijuana in Washington State - Financial Services Issues, Washington State Department of Financial Institutions 
Marijuana Tax Reporting Guide, Washington State Liquor and Cannabis Board, 2016
Cannabis industry, Salal Credit Union
Marijuana banking updates at FinCEN "Frequently Requested FOIA-Processed Records" site

Banking in Washington (state)
Banking
Cannabis finance